Amar de Nuevo is a Spanish-language telenovela produced by the United States-based television network Telemundo and Promofilm (Imagina US).

Plot
The story begins one tragic day, when Frijolito was in a traffic accident with his best friend Palito and his parents, Salvador and Veronica.

Veronica's cousin, Bulmaro, had received orders from his boss, Max, to cause the accident. Max wanted revenge on Salvador, as he had hoped to get closer to Veronica. After that day, everything changed. Frijolito and Salvador were killed in the accident, Veronica was in a coma for two years and Palito was entrusted to the care of his grandmother Lily.

Frijolito could hear Palito praying for his mother, Veronica, every day. Palito never doubted that one day she would recover. Frijolito's "boss" could also hear the prayers of Palito, and decided to send him as Palito's guardian angel. Though nobody believed that it was possible, Veronica woke up, proving that miracles do happen.

When Veronica came out of the coma, she was surprised to learn that the love of her life had died in the accident. She felt that she had no reason to live, but her mother reminded her that she had a son who loved her deeply and that she should keep going for his sake.

Veronica decided to be strong for Palito, but she declared that she would never love again. It was then that Frijolito's "boss" decided to send him on a mission: find a new parent for Palito.

Román García del Solar was a perfect candidate. He was a good man who had also lost not only his wife, but his faith in love. His only reason for living was also his children, María Sol, Jorgito, and Flor. The only obstacle was his sister-in-law Rosilda, the twin sister of his deceased wife, Laura. Rosilda was obsessed with winning the heart of her brother-in-law.

Both Roman and Veronica had come to believe that they would never love again, but Frijolito would teach them that it is possible. They would not need magic to find each other; their hearts would serve as the guide.

Cast

2011 telenovelas
2011 American television series debuts
2011 American television series endings
2011 Mexican television series debuts
2011 Mexican television series endings
Telemundo telenovelas
Television series by Universal Television